Goran Karan (born 2 April 1964) is a Croatian vocalist. He specializes in songs influenced by Dalmatian folk music and is known for his powerful and refined tenor voice. Karan's collaboration with composer Zdenko Runjić led to some of his most acclaimed work, which won him several awards.

Biography
Karan was the lead singer of Croatian rock group Big Blue, before becoming a solo artist in 1997.

In 2000 he represented Croatia at Eurovision Song Contest, after winning the Croatian pre-selection Dora. In the Eurovision Song Contest, he ended up in the ninth place with his song "Ostani" ("Stay").

In 2005 he was one of the judges in Hrvatski idol, Croatian version of Pop Idol. Karan's song "Ružo moja bila" won the 2005 Split Festival song competition, as well as 2005 Sunčane skale festival in Herceg Novi.

In summer 2007, deeply moved by the Kornati fire tragedy, in which 13 volunteer firemen perished, composed in the spur of the moment the song "Ovo nije kraj" ("This Is Not the End"), gathered under the name Split Star a group of famous singers (Oliver Dragojević, Marko Perković Thompson, Tedi Spalato, Dražen Zečić, Alen Nižetić, Hari Rončević) from the Split area, that performed it with him in a music video, all of this in less than fifteen days .

Albums
 Kao da te ne volim (Like I Don't Love You) - 1999
 Vagabundo (Vagabund) - 2000
 Ahoj! (Ahoy!) - 2003
 Od srca do usana (From Heart to the Lips) - 2005
 Zlatna kolekcija (Golden Collection) - 2005
 Dite Ljubavi (Child of Love) - 2008

References

External links

  www.gorankaran.hr (Official site)
  gorankaran.atspace.com (Fan site)

1964 births
Living people
Eurovision Song Contest entrants for Croatia
Eurovision Song Contest entrants of 2000
Singers from Belgrade
Croats of Serbia
Musicians from Split, Croatia
Croatian tenors
Croatian pop singers
20th-century Croatian male singers
Indexi Award winners
Hayat Production artists
21st-century Croatian male singers